Slaviša Žungul, known in the United States as Steve Zungul (born 28 July 1954) is a retired Yugoslav American soccer striker.

Žungul began his career with Hajduk in his native Yugoslavia before controversially moving to the United States where he became a dominant indoor soccer striker. His indoor career began with the New York Arrows of Major Indoor Soccer League and ended with the San Diego Sockers. His amazing scoring ability earned him the nickname "Lord of All Indoors". He also spent two seasons playing outdoor soccer with the Golden Bay Earthquakes of the North American Soccer League. In 1984, he was the NASL MVP. He also earned fourteen caps with the Yugoslavia national football team between 1972 and 1976.

Early life
Žungul was born Slaviša Ivanović in Požarevac, but his biological father died when he was still an infant. His mother Danica quickly remarried and moved to Kaštel Lukšić near Split, PR Croatia where baby Slaviša was given his stepfather's last name.

Club career

Hajduk Split
When he was sixteen, Žungul began his football career in Split, playing for Hajduk starting in 1972 and continuing until 1978. He led the team in scoring every season and finished his time at Hajduk with 176 goals. During his six years with the team, he led them to three Yugoslav First League titles, in 1974 and 1975 as well as four Yugoslav Cup trophies.

At Hajduk he quickly established himself as the focal point of head coach Tomislav Ivić's setup as well as becoming a fan favourite for his off-the-cuff ways and jet-set lifestyle, often seen in bars around the city while dating models, pinups, singers, and pageant contestants. His scoring prowess at Hajduk drew comparisons to Gerd Müller in the Yugoslav press.

By the time he turned 24, Žungul's prominence was such that he began receiving lucrative offers from NASL clubs in the United States. However, Yugoslav sporting regulations at the time stipulated that players could not transfer abroad until completing their mandatory Yugoslav People's Army (JNA) stint and turning 28 years of age. In certain cases exemptions were granted so that a player's transfer would be allowed in the calendar year during which he'll be turning 28 or even a year early, but the completion of the army stint was absolutely mandatory. While twenty-four-year-old Žungul was years away from even considering a move abroad, he was on increasingly bad terms with Hajduk management—led by club president —over unpaid wages. The star player became concerned the club would arrange for him to be sent off to his army service just to further delay the payments they owed him.

On 3 December 1978, Žungul played in Hajduk's last league match before the 1978-79 mid-season winter break—a 5–0 home thrashing of FK Sarajevo at the Stari plac Stadium—scoring twice thus increasing his half-season scoring tally to 12 goals. Not suspecting anything amiss, Hajduk granted permission.

In actuality, through countryman Dragan Popović, Žungul (represented by sports agent Ante "Bekin" Kuzmić) had already agreed a contract with the newly-established, Popović-coached New York Arrows of the also recently launched Major Indoor Soccer League (MISL). Žungul's idea was to defect from Yugoslavia, initially play some indoor soccer in the MISL, and then switch over to "real soccer" in the NASL once the dust settles.

Within weeks, in late December 1978, his defection and deception became known back home, creating one of the biggest scandals in Yugoslav sporting history. Hajduk management was furious, starting a smear campaign against the player in Yugoslav media, branding him a traitor, a deserter, and a drunk. They also got the Yugoslav FA (FSJ) to enlist its FIFA connections and request a ban on Žungul taking part in any FIFA-affiliated competitions. FSJ did so and FIFA granted the ban, effectively blackballing him from the NASL. This left the MISL, which was not affiliated with FIFA, as his only option.

Indoor soccer: New York Arrows
Settling for an indoor football career, Žungul—now known as Steve Zungul—tried to make the best of the new situation. After playing European Cup football with Hajduk as well competing at the European Championship with Yugoslavia, the 24-year-old suddenly found himself in a whole new sport resembling human pinball with ice hockey-style dasher boards around the field, buzzers, flashing lights, disco music, galloping players and the ball rebounding haphazardly off the walls and around the turf. Though financially well compensated for his services, the move to indoor in professional terms meant being reduced to playing with and against players whose skills and abilities were far inferior to his.

Making his debut in the Arrows' opening game of the season in Nassau Coliseum he immediately established his scoring credentials, recording four goals. He would soon start scoring goals like a man possessed. He finished the campaign close second to Fred Grgurev in the 1978–79 season scoring race as the Arrows won the title. In his second season, Zungul led the MISL in goals scored in 1979–80, guiding his team to the second straight league title and winning the league MVP honours.

In the 1980–81 season, Zungul achieved an amazing feat, scoring 108 goals in 40 games. In comparison, the second leading scorer Vic Davidson of the Phoenix Inferno scored only 50 goals. Zungul was well on his way to earning his eventual moniker "Lord of All Indoors", first given to him by Sports Illustrated writer JD Reed. The Arrows won the title again (their third straight), while Zungul won MVP for the second consecutive season.

Zungul picked up another 103 goals the next season, 1981–82, leading the team to yet another league title while co-sharing the league MVP honour with Polish forward Stan Terlecki. All the while, Zungul pursued every legal avenue available in order to be allowed to play outdoor soccer. He took his case to the Supreme Court of the United States and finally managed to procure a licence to play on the big pitch.

For the 1982–83 season, he began the campaign with the Arrows but the team was in decline as well as his scoring rate that took a bit of dip compared to previous season. Now 28-years-of-age, in January 1983 he asked for an increase of his $150,000 annual paycheck, knowing that the financially strapped management couldn't afford. The Arrows responded by trading Steve Zungul to the Golden Bay Earthquakes of the North American Soccer League (NASL), who were playing the 1982–83 MISL season as a guest team, for Gary Etherington and Gordon Hill. While billed as a move to "Americanize" the Arrows, it was largely a cost saving device. While Zungul still led the league in scoring, he bagged only 75 goals.

Now the FIFA ban became the issue once again, and FSJ chimed in, asking for the ban to be upheld. It wasn't, due to the Earthquakes refusing to honour it by referencing the US Supreme Court decision, meaning the player would get his chance in the outdoor game again following a four-year absence.

Return to outdoor: Golden Bay Earthquakes
Zungul went on to become a first team NASL All Star in both 1983 and 1984.

In 1984, he capped his outdoor career by being named the NASL MVP. That year, Zungul registered 20 goals and 10 assists in 24 games, but could not keep the Earthquakes out of the bottom of the Western Conference.

Meanwhile, without Zungul's scoring touch the Arrows collapsed and folded at the end of the 1983–84 season.

Back to indoor: San Diego Sockers and Tacoma Stars
When the NASL itself collapsed at the end of the 1984 season, Zungul moved to the San Diego Sockers (MISL).  He led the league again in scoring in 1985 and 1986, this time playing for the San Diego Sockers. On 5 February 1986, the Sockers sold Zungul to the Tacoma Stars where he played from 1986 to 1988. In 1988, he returned to the Sockers where he ended his career in 1990. It was not until 1987 that his run as top scorer finally came to a close, as another indoor luminary, the Dallas Sidekicks' Tatu, took Zungul's place at the top of the scoring charts.  Zungul was also named the league's MVP from 1979 to 1982, and then again in 1985 and 1986.  At one time, he was the all-time goal scoring leader in indoor soccer with 715 goals.  That currently ranks fourth behind Hector Marinaro, Zoran Karić, and Tatu.

International career
Žungul made his debut for Yugoslavia in a September 1974 friendly match against Italy, coming on as a 46th-minute substitute for Danilo Popivoda, and earned a total of 14 caps, scoring no goals. He played in Euro 1976 but never played in the World Cup because he did not serve the mandatory stint in the Yugoslav People's Army (JNA). His final international was an October 1978 European CHampionship qualification match away against Romania.

Post-playing
Simultaneous to playing soccer in America, Žungul invested his earnings in various business ventures including real-estate. He has at one time owned properties in Wellington, Florida.

Žungul reportedly resides in San Pasqual Valley near Escondido, California with his wife Lorenza and their two children Sashka and Marco.

References

External links
 
 San Diego newspaper profile
 
 NASL Stats

1954 births
Living people
Sportspeople from Požarevac
Association football forwards
Yugoslav footballers
Yugoslavia international footballers
UEFA Euro 1976 players
HNK Hajduk Split players
New York Arrows players
San Jose Earthquakes (1974–1988) players
San Diego Sockers (original MISL) players
Tacoma Stars players
Yugoslav First League players
Major Indoor Soccer League (1978–1992) players
North American Soccer League (1968–1984) players
North American Soccer League (1968–1984) indoor players
Yugoslav expatriate footballers
Expatriate soccer players in the United States
Yugoslav expatriate sportspeople in the United States